The Anton Tedesko Medal is awarded by the International Association of Bridge and Structural Engineers (IABSE) Foundation to both honour a Laureate and financially support a young engineering Fellow of the Association.

The medal is awarded to a distinguished structural engineer as recognition of his/her life achievements, and includes a grant of 25,000 CHF for study leave for a promising young engineer to gain practical experience in a prestigious engineering firm outside his/her home country.

The medal is named after and honours Anton Tedesko (1903 - 1994) (sometimes written 'Tedesco') who was an outstanding engineer, eminent designer and builder of innovative structures. the award was created in 1998.

Past recipients include:

See also
List of engineering awards
List of prizes named after people

References

International awards
Structural engineering awards
Awards established in 1998